Veronika Kalinina (born 19 January 1999) is a Russian synchronised swimmer.

She won a gold medal in the team free routine competition at the 2018 European Aquatics Championships.

References

1999 births
Living people
Russian synchronized swimmers
World Aquatics Championships medalists in synchronised swimming
Artistic swimmers at the 2019 World Aquatics Championships
European Aquatics Championships medalists in synchronised swimming
European Games gold medalists for Russia
European Games medalists in synchronised swimming
Synchronised swimmers at the 2015 European Games
People from Chekhovsky District
Sportspeople from Moscow Oblast
21st-century Russian women